The , commonly known as the , is a semi-professional women's association football league in Japan.

The Nadeshiko League consists of two divisions that correspond to the second and third levels of the Japanese women's football pyramid respectively. Teams are promoted and relegated between the divisions, and between the Nadeshiko League Division 2 and the fourth-level Japanese regional leagues, based on performance in the previous season. Prior to 2021, the Nadeshiko League occupied the top level of the Japanese women's football pyramid as well; that level is now represented by the fully professional WE League.

History 
The Japan Women's Football League, or the L. League, was founded in 1989. From 1993 to 1999 it adopted an Apertura and Clausura system, similar to the J. League system of that era. From 2000 to 2003 the clubs were divided into East and West groups and then the top clubs of each would go into a championship group, with the bottom clubs in a relegation group. In 2004 the single-table format was brought back. Teams from this early era would host annual training camps to build skills and relationships with international women's football clubs, such as those in the United States and Australia.

In 2004 the L. League acquired the nickname the Nadeshiko League. Nadeshiko is the name of the dianthus flower and was chosen from suggestions by fans, signifying an ideal of a dutiful Japanese woman.

In the 2004 season, the L. League added a second division, and until 2009 the league operated in the same way as the old Japan Soccer League for men where the bottom club in the second division playing off against a regional league playoff winner. In 2010, the second division was divided into east and west groups of six teams each; the winners of each group were promoted to the first division.

After Japan's World Cup win in 2011, the L. League saw an upsurge in popularity. In 2015, the league added a third division called the Nadeshiko  was added, and the first and second divisions now had 10 teams each.

In 2020, the Japan Football Association announced that the newly established WE League will become the top level for women's football in Japan in 2021. The Nadeshiko League would then become the second to fourth levels of the Japanese women's football pyramid. After many top teams left for the WE League, the Nadeshiko League abolished the third division in 2021.

Structure 

Since 2021, the Nadeshiko League consists of two divisions:

Clubs

Champions

Division 1
Bold indicate doubles with the Empress's Cup.

Wins by club
Clubs in bold are those competing in Division 1 as of the 2021 season. Clubs in italics no longer exist.

Notes

Wins by region

Division 2

Challenge League

2022 season

Division 1

Division 2

Previous clubs
The following clubs are not competing in the Nadeshiko League during the 2021 season, but have previously competed in the Nadeshiko League for at least one season.

Joined WE League in 2021

Mynavi Sendai
Urawa Reds
Omiya Ardija Ventus (formerly FC Jumonji Ventus)
Elfen Saitama
JEF United Chiba
NTV Tokyo Verdy Beleza
Nojima Stella Kanagawa Sagamihara
AC Nagano Parceiro
Albirex Niigata
INAC Kobe Leonessa

Relegated to regional leagues
Je Vrille Kagoshima: relegated to Kyushu League from 2014
Shimizudaihachi Pleiades: relegated to Tokai League from 2015
Mashiki Renaissance Kumamoto F.C.: relegated to Kyushu League from 2016

Defunct
Fujita Soccer Club Mercury (affiliated with Shonan Bellmare)
Nikko Securities Dream Ladies
Nissan F.C. Ladies (affiliated with Yokohama Marinos)
OKI F.C. Winds
Shiroki F.C. Serena
Suzuyo Shimizu F.C. Lovely Ladies (affiliated with Shimizu S-Pulse)
Tasaki Perule F.C.
Tokyo Shidax L.S.C. (formerly Shinko Seiko F.C. Clair)
Urawa Ladies F.C.
TEPCO Mareeze (dissolved after Fukushima Daiichi nuclear disaster; many of the players moved to Vegalta Sendai Ladies)
Aguilas Kobe
Hoyo Sukarabu F.C.

Division 1 awards

Most Valuable Player

Top Goalscorers

Best Young Player

See also

 Football in Japan
 Women's football in Japan
 Japan Football Association (JFA)
 Japanese association football league system
 WE League (I)
 Japanese Regional Leagues (women) (IV)
 Empress's Cup (National Cup)
 Nadeshiko League Cup (League Cup)

References

External links
Nadeshiko League Official website 
NADESHIKO LEAGUE 1 at women.soccerway.com 
NADESHIKO LEAGUE 2 at women.soccerway.com 

 
Japan
2
Football leagues in Japan
Sports leagues in Japan
Professional sports leagues in Japan